Glasney College was founded in 1265 at Penryn, Cornwall, by Bishop Bronescombe and was a centre of ecclesiastical power in medieval Cornwall and probably the best known and most important of Cornwall's religious institutions.

History
The site at Glasney was at the head of a small creek. Much of the building was modelled on Exeter Cathedral, and as a defence Bishop Bronescombe built three towers, forming one block that acted as a defence both for the college and for the town of Penryn.

After its founding in 1265, during the later Middle Ages, Glasney was the largest clerical body in Cornwall, as large as any of the ancient monasteries had been, and with an equivalent income, mainly derived from the rectorial tithes of Budock, Colan, Feock, Kea, Manaccan, Mevagissey, Mylor, St Allen, St Enoder, St Gluvias, St Goran, St Just in Penwith, Sithney, and Zennor.

There were no monks at this college or collegiate church, but it had an establishment of one provost and 12 secular canons and held the patronage of sixteen parishes. William Bodrugan was the first official Provost of Glasney, from 17 April 1283 to 1288, before he became Archdeacon of Cornwall.

Miracle plays were performed here and elsewhere in Cornwall in the Cornish language. Only a few Cornish-language plays survive today, but those that do include several composed at Glasney, the Ordinalia: The Creation of the World, The Passion of our Lord, The Resurrection of Our Lord; and Bewnans Meriasek, the Life of St Meriasek, patron saint of Camborne.

Destruction of Glasney
King Henry VIII's dissolution of the monasteries, between 1536 and 1545, signalled the end of the big Cornish priories, but as a chantry church Glasney survived until 1548, when it suffered the same fate. The smashing and looting of the Cornish colleges at Glasney and Crantock brought an end to the formal scholarship that helped sustain the Cornish language and the Cornish cultural identity, and played a significant part in fomenting the opposition to cultural 'reforms' that led to the Prayer Book Rebellion of 1549. The granite taken from the college was used to form and build King Henry VIII's fort at Pendennis castle.

Apart from being sorely missed centres of indigenous cultural excellence, many in Cornwall saw these institutions as bridges to the Celtic past, back even to the Christianised paganism of their forefathers.

When traditional religious processions and pilgrimages were banned in 1548, commissioners were sent out to destroy all symbols of Cornish Roman Catholicism. In Cornwall, this job fell to William Body, whose desecration of religious shrines angered many. Along with other assaults on Cornish legal rights, culture, language and religion, this led to his murder on 5 April 1548 at Helston.

Legacy
Today the only surviving remains of Glasney are a length of wall and an arch. In 1986 the Friends of Glasney College Society was established in Penryn by Dr James Whetter, who in his book The History of Glasney College describes the destruction of Glasney as a damaging blow to the history and spirit of the Cornish nation.

Memorial
At the present-day Penryn Campus of Falmouth University and the University of Exeter, the student accommodation has been named Glasney Student Village, which is split into two areas, Glasney View and Glasney Parc.

Footnotes

References
Kent, Alan M. "Glasney College."  In Celtic Culture: A Historical Encyclopedia, ed. John T. Koch, pp 814–815. Santa Barbara, California: ABC-CLIO Inc, 2006. This entry also contains a brief bibliography.  
Penn, Peter. "Glasney Collegiate Church: A College of European Fame." Cornish Notes and Queries. Penzance: The Cornish Telegraph Office, 1906. A review of Thurstan C. Peter's book. Full text version available on Google Books.
 Peter, Thurstan Collins. The History of Glasney Collegiate Church, Cornwall.  Camborne: Camborne Printing and Stationery Company, 1903. Full text version available on Google Books.
Sowell, C. R.  "The Collegiate Church of St. Thomas of Glasney."  Journal of the Royal Institution of Cornwall, vol. 1, no. 3, 1865. 21–34.  
 Vincent, John A. C., translator.  Abstract of Glasney Cartulary: a Quarto Manuscript containing 96 Leaves of Parchment and Bound in Old Oak Boards, in the Library of Jonathan Rashleigh, Esquire, of Menabilly, County of Cornwall. Truro: Lake and Lake. 1879. Full text version available on Google Books. 
 Vincent, John. The History of Glasney College Church. 1903.
 Whetter, James. The History of Glasney College. Padstow: Tabb House, 1988.

External links
The Friends of Glasney College. Aims to promote an interest in Glasney College, to protect the area, to encourage methodical investigation of the site and its history.
History of Glasney College
History of Glasney College (published by Soskernow)
Glasney at the Roseland Institute
Penryn Museum

   

Cornish culture
Cornish language
Roman Catholic churches in Cornwall
Medieval Cornwall
Monasteries in Cornwall
1265 establishments in England
1548 disestablishments
1540s disestablishments in England
Former buildings and structures in Cornwall